Andrea Ulrika Aagot Hansen (born 22 May 2000) is a Danish female handball player for København Håndbold and the Danish national team.

She made her debut on the Danish national team on 1 October 2020, against Norway.

She represented Denmark at the 2020 European Women's Handball Championship.

Achievements 
Danish Handball League: 
Winner: 2018

References

External links

2000 births
Living people
Sportspeople from Frederiksberg
Danish female handball players
21st-century Danish women